Kramolin is a village in the municipality of Sevlievo, in Gabrovo Province, in northern central Bulgaria.

Kramolin Cove in Greenwich Island in the South Shetland Islands, Antarctica is named after Kramolin.

References

Villages in Gabrovo Province